National Route 10 (N10) is a  primary national route that forms part of the Philippine highway network and a spur of Asian Highway 26 (AH26) of the Asian Highway Network. It connects the provinces of Misamis Oriental, Bukidnon and Davao del Sur.

History 
Two roads were designated as N10 during the addition of the national routes in 2014 by the Department of Public Works and Highways, namely Sayre Highway (Cagayan de Oro to Maramag) and Bukidnon–Davao Road (Maramag to Davao).

Route description

Cagayan de Oro to Maramag 

N10 starts from a junction and northern terminus in Butuan–Cagayan de Oro–Iligan Road (N9) and starts as Sayre Highway in Cagayan de Oro. It treverses to the cities and municipalities of Manolo Fortich, Impasugong, Malaybalay, Valencia and Maramag. The road after reaching the junction of Bukidnon–Davao Road, changes the route to N943 and continues at the former route.

Maramag to Davao 

N10 continues in Bukidnon–Davao Road, starting from Maramag. It then traverses to the municipalities of Quezon and Kitaotao, before reaching the city of Davao. It reaches its southern terminus at Maharlika Highway/Davao–Cotabato Road (N1/AH26) in Talomo, Davao City.

Intersections

References 

Roads in Misamis Oriental
Roads in Bukidnon
Roads in Davao del Sur